Frank Thompson  is an American sport shooter. Thompson was born on March 11, 1988, in Alliance, Nebraska, United States.  Thompson became a member of the National Development Team in 2006.  At the 2012 Summer Olympics he competed in the Men's skeet, finishing in 8th place.  He finished in 21st at the 2016 Olympics.

References

American male sport shooters
Living people
Olympic shooters of the United States
Shooters at the 2012 Summer Olympics
Shooters at the 2016 Summer Olympics
1988 births
People from Alliance, Nebraska